Ponte Tresa railway station is a railway station in the municipality of Ponte Tresa in the Swiss canton of Ticino. The station is the terminus of the metre gauge Lugano–Ponte Tresa railway (FLP), from Lugano.

The station has two platform tracks, plus two additional sidings, under a concrete roof with car parking above.

Services 
 the following services stop at Ponte Tresa:

Autopostale buses connect the station to Luino, Monteggio and Novaggio. In summer the Società Navigazione del Lago di Lugano (SNL) operates a boat service to and from Lugano from a landing stage five minutes walk from the station.

Gallery

References

External links 
 
 

Ponte Tresa
Ferrovie Luganesi stations